Charlotte is the largest parish of Saint Vincent and the Grenadines, situated on the eastern coast of the island of Saint Vincent. With an area of 149 km², its size is comparable to that of the British Virgin Islands.) The parish has the longest coastline of all the parishes and is also larger than the three smallest parishes combined. The parish possesses a very rough and rugged topography with very little flat land occurring towards the coast. as a result of these features, parts of the north of the parish cannot be accessed by a main road. Up until the building of a bridge over the Rabacca Dry River access to the north side of the river was not possible when rain caused the river to swell and make the path impassable.

Its capital is Georgetown, which is also the second largest settlement in the country.

 Area: 149 km² (57 mi²)
 Population: 38,000 (2000 estimates)

The parish also includes the Cow and Calves, rocks off the north shore of Saint Vincent.

Populated places
The following populated places are located in the parish of Charlotte:

 Adelphi
 Biabou
 Byera Village
 Chapmans
 Colonarie
 Fancy
 Friendly
 Georgetown
 Greiggs
 Mesopotamia
 New Sandy Bay Village
 North Union
 Orange Hill, Saint Vincent
 Peruvian Vale
 Rabaka
 Richland Park
 Sans Souci
 South Rivers
 Turema
 Waterloo

References

External links

 Parishes of Saint Vincent and the Grenadines, Statoids.com

Parishes of Saint Vincent and the Grenadines